Wong Chuk Hang is a neighbourhood in the Southern District of Hong Kong Island, in Hong Kong.

History
Neolithic artifacts have been unearthed in a region called Chung Hom Wan, which is not far from Wong Chuk Hang. In 1550 the Hong Kong Village was established in Wong Chuk Hang; it still exists, much diminished in size, as Wong Chuk Hang Kau Wai. A satellite village, Wong Chuk Hang San Wai, was established in the 1860s and 1870s. The name Staunton (along with valley and creek) is likely linked to Sir George Staunton, 2nd Baronet.

Features
Features of Wong Chuk Hang include:
 Grantham Hospital
 Holy Spirit Seminary
 Hong Kong Police Training School
 Ocean Park
 Wong Chuk Hang Estate

Economy

Climate

Transport
Road
Aberdeen Tunnel is a two-tube tunnel linking Wong Chuk Hang and Happy Valley.

Rail
Ocean Park station and Wong Chuk Hang station, stations of the MTR South Island line.

Education
Wong Chuk Hang is in Primary One Admission (POA) School Net 18. Within the school net are multiple aided schools (operated independently but funded with government money) and Hong Kong Southern District Government
Primary School.

See also
 Wong Chuk Hang (constituency)
 Prehistoric Hong Kong

References

 
Southern District, Hong Kong